Rodopi is a village in the municipality of Haskovo, in Haskovo Province, in southern Bulgaria.

References

Villages in Haskovo Province